Edgar Yenokyan (20 July 1986) is an Armenian freestyle wrestler. He won a bronze medal at the 2009 European Wrestling Championships in Vilnius.

External links
 The-Sports.org

1986 births
Living people
Armenian male sport wrestlers
European Wrestling Championships medalists
21st-century Armenian people